Mýtne Ludany is a village and municipality in the Levice District in the Nitra Region of Slovakia.

History
In historical records the village was first mentioned in 1375.

Geography
The village lies at an altitude of 157 metres and covers an area of 17.652 km². It has a population of 916 people (07/2007).

Ethnicity
The village is approximately 54% Slovak and 46% Magyar.

Facilities
The village has a public library and football pitch.

External links
http://www.statistics.sk/mosmis/eng/run.html

Villages and municipalities in Levice District